Cymindis fedtschenkoi is a type of ground beetle in the subfamily Harpalinae. It was described by Tschitscherine in 1896.

References

fedtschenkoi
Beetles described in 1896